The Earth Museum is an anthology of 18 science-fiction stories by 18 Turkish sci-fi writers published in January 2018 by İthaki Publishing Company. 

To mark the 18th anniversary of its foundation, Bilimkurgu Kulübü (The Science-Fiction Club) has compiled a collection of science fiction stories to be published in 2018 under the title The Earth Museum, an anthology featuring 18 Turkish science-fiction writers who contributed to the book with 18 short stories. The work has also been endorsed with a message by the legendary sci-fi and fantasy author Ursula K. Le Guin. This message, of which the Turkish translation adorns the back cover of the book, also has historical value as her last words published before the author’s death on 22 January 2018.

"I was very happy to learn that Bilimkurgu Kulübü plans an anthology of science fiction stories by Turkish writers. In these troubled times, all artists are strengthened by knowing of other artists working to assert and uphold the creative principle, and of non-profit publishers who support them by freeing their work from the constraints of the market-place. All of us, all over the world, seem to be struggling through a great darkness. Such works are like lamps lighted where we need them most, illuminating what is around them and the way we need to go. The fuel of those lamps is the imagination. Thank you, my Turkish readers and friends and fellow-writers, for keeping the light burning." (Ursula K. Le Guin, January, 2018)

Contents 

The Earth Museum features Burak Albayrak as the editor, Tuðçe Nida Sevin as the coordinator and includes a preface by Bulent Akkoc. The collection comprises the following short stories:

See also 
 Ursula K. Le Guin

References

External links 
 Bilimkurgu Kulübü (The Science-Fiction Club) Official Site
 Ithaki Yayinlari Official Site
 Amazon

2018 anthologies
Science fiction anthologies
Turkish short story collections
Turkish science fiction